Slavery in what became the U.S. state of Illinois existed for more than a century. Illinois did not become a state until 1818, but earlier regional systems of government had already established slavery.  France introduced African slavery to the Illinois Country in the early eighteenth century. French and other inhabitants of Illinois continued the practice of owning slaves throughout the Illinois Country's period of British rule (1763-1783), as well as after its transfer to the new United States in 1783 as Illinois County, Virginia. The Northwest Ordinance (1787) banned slavery in Illinois and the rest of the Northwest Territory.  Nonetheless, slavery remained a contentious issue, through the period when Illinois was part of the Indiana Territory and the Illinois Territory and some slaves remained in bondage after statehood until their gradual emancipation by the Illinois Supreme Court.  Thus the history of slavery in Illinois covers several sometimes overlapping periods: French (c. 1660s-1764); British (c. 1763-1783); Virginia (c. 1778-1785); United States Northwest Territory (1787-1800), Indiana Territory (1800-1809), Illinois Territory (1809-1818) and the State of Illinois (after 1818).

During the early decades of statehood, the number of slaves in Illinois dwindled. In the decade before the American Civil War, an anti-Black law was adopted in the state which made it difficult for new Black emigrants to enter or live in Illinois.  Near the close of the civil war, Illinois repealed that law and became the first state to ratify the Thirteenth Amendment to the Constitution of the United States, which abolished slavery nationally.

Colonial period

During the French colonial period of Illinois, Illinois was a part of the region known as the "Illinois Country", which also loosely encompassed lands that would become the future U.S. states of Indiana, Wisconsin, and Missouri. The Illinois Country was part of New France and was governed by its slavery laws. French settlers first brought African slaves into the Illinois Country from Saint-Domingue (present-day Haiti) around 1720 under the terms of the Code Noir, which defined the legal conditions of slavery in the French Empire and restricted the activities of free Negro people.  Although older accounts claim that Philip François Renault imported five hundred Negro slaves to the Illinois Country in 1721, it is likely that he imported far fewer. A document "from 1720 describes the Jesuits as owning sixteen to eighteen slaves, 'Negroes and Savages .'"  After an unsuccessful attempt at lead mining, Renault founded St. Philippe, Illinois, in 1723, and used his enslaved people for agricultural purposes to produce crops.

The institution of slavery continued after Britain acquired the eastern Illinois Country in 1763 following the French and Indian War. At the time, nine hundred slaves lived in the territory, although some of the French would take at least three hundred with them as they left the future state of Illinois for lands west of the Mississippi River (in future Missouri).

United States territory

Slavery continued following the American Revolutionary War, when the territory was ceded to the United States. The first legislation against slavery was the Northwest Ordinance of 1787, which forbade slavery in the Northwest Territory. However, territorial laws and practices allowed human bondage to continue in various forms. Territorial governors Arthur St. Clair and Charles Willing Byrd supported slavery and did not enforce the ordinance. When the Indiana Territory (which included the future State of Illinois) was split from the Northwest Territory in 1800, residents petitioned the United States Senate to allow slaves. A proposal offered emancipation to Illinois-born male slaves at age thirty-one and female slaves at age twenty-eight. Southern-born slaves were to be slaves for life. No response to the proposal was ever issued.

The Illinois Territory, created in 1809, kept the Indiana Territory's Black Code, which restricted free blacks and required them to carry documents to prove their freedom. Slaveowners could keep their workers in bondage by forcing them to sign indentures of very long length (40 to 99 years), threatening them with sale elsewhere if they refused. Furthermore, free black people could be kidnapped and sold in St. Louis or states where such sales were legal. The Illinois Salines, a U.S. government-run salt works near Shawneetown was one of the largest businesses in the Illinois Territory; it exploited between 1,000 and 2,000 slaves hired out from masters in slave states to keep the salt brine kettles continuously boiling.

Slavery during statehood

While Illinois' first state constitution in 1818 stated that slavery shall not be "thereafter introduced", slavery was still tolerated in the early years of Illinois statehood, and the constitution did not have a clause forbidding an amendment to allow slavery. However, due to the efforts of a coalition of religious leaders (Morris Birkbeck, Peter Cartwright, James Lemen, and John Mason Peck), publisher Hooper Warren and politicians (especially Edward Coles, Daniel Pope Cook and Risdon Moore), Illinois voters in 1824 rejected a proposal for a new constitutional convention that could have made slavery legal outright.  The constitution also had a time limited exception to 1825, in which the Illinois Salines (salt works) could continue the use of slave labor, as it had for decades under prior governments, provided the slaves used were only imported temporarily from outside the state (primarily from nearby Kentucky).

Slavecatchers from Missouri would travel to Illinois either to recapture escaped slaves, or kidnap free blacks for sale into slavery, particularly since Illinois' legislature tightened the Black Code to state that recaptured escaped slaves would have time added to their indentures. The following year a law barred blacks from being witnesses in court cases against whites, then two years later barred blacks from suing for their freedom. In Phoebe v Jay, Judge Samuel D. Lockwood, previously Coles' anti-convention and abolitionist ally, held that the 40-year indenture of Phoebe (entered into in 1814) could be transferred to Joseph Jay's heir, his son William Jay, arguing that the new state's Constitution superseded the anti-slavery provisions of the Northwest Ordinance.

Despite these laws tolerating de facto slavery, in a series of legal decisions beginning with Cornelius v. Cohen in 1825, the Illinois Supreme Court developed a jurisprudence to gradually emancipate the enslaved people of Illinois. In that first case, the justices decided that in order for a contract of servitude to be valid, both parties must be in agreement and sign it. In Choisser v. Hargrave, the court decided that indentures would not be enforced unless they complied with all provisions of Illinois law, including that they be registered within 30 days of entering the state. In 1836, the court in Boon v. Juliet held that children of registered slaves brought into the state were free, and could themselves only be indentured until the age of 18 or 21 years (depending on their sex) according to the state's Constitution. In Sarah v. Borders (1843), the court held that if any fraud occurred in the signing of an indenture contract, it was void. Finally, in the 1845 decision, Jarrot v. Jarrot, the court ended tolerance of slavery even for descendants of former French slaves, holding that descendants of slaves born after the 1787 Northwest Ordinance were born free.

In one of the predecessors of the Dred Scott decision, Moore v. People, 55 U.S. 13 (1852), the Supreme Court of the United States upheld a conviction for harboring a fugitive slave from Missouri, as had the Illinois Supreme Court a few years earlier.  Illinois residents participated in the underground railroad for fugitive slaves seeking freedom, with major routes beginning in the Mississippi River towns of Chester, Alton and Quincy, to Chicago, and lesser routes from Cairo to Springfield, Illinois or up the banks of the Wabash River.

The Illinois' Constitution of 1848 banned slavery, section 16 of its Declaration of Rights specifying, "There shall be neither slavery nor involuntary servitude in the State, except as a punishment for crime whereof the party shall have been duly convicted."  Subsequent legislation, however, led to one of the most restrictive Black Code systems in the nation until the American Civil War. The Illinois Black Code of 1853 (officially, "An Act to Prevent the Immigration of Free Negros into this State") prohibited any Black persons from outside of the state from staying in the state for more than ten days, subjecting Black emigrants who remain beyond the ten days to arrest, detention, a $50 fine, potential debt labor for those who could not pay, or deportation. The law led to increased political organizing within Illinois's black community, with the holding of the first statewide "Colored Convention" in October 1853 to protest the law.  The Black Code was repealed in early 1865, the same year that the Civil War ended.  At that time, Illinois also became the first state to ratify the Thirteenth Amendment to the United States Constitution, which abolished slavery nationally.

See also
Illinois in the American Civil War
Slavery in the United States

Notes

References
Alvord, Clarence Walworth.  The Illinois Country, 1673-1818, Volume 1.  Springfield, IL:  Illinois Centennial Commission, 1920.
Barr, Juliana.  "From Captives to Slaves: Commodifying Indian Women in the Borderlands," Journal of American History, 92, no. 1, June 2005.  Bloomington, IN.
Berlin, Ira.  Many Thousands Gone: The First Two Centuries of Slavery in North America. Cambridge, MA:  Harvard University Press, 2009. 
Berry, Daina Ramey.  The Price for Their Pound of Flesh: The Value of the Enslaved from Womb to Grave in the Building of a Nation.  Boston, MA:  Beacon Press, 2017.
Berwanger, Eugene H.  The Frontier Against Slavery: Western Anti-Negro Prejudice and the Slavery Extension Controversy.  Urbana, IL:  University of Illinois Press, 1967.
Blackmore, Jacqueline.  African American and Race Relations in Gallatin County, Illinois:  from the 18th century to 1870.  Ann Arbor: Proquest, 1996.
Bridges, Roger D.  "The Illinois Black Codes", Illinois History Teacher Vol. 3:2, 2–12. Illinois Historic Preservation Agency.  Springfield, IL, 1996.
Cross, John David.  The First Americans.  New Word City, 2016.
Demers, E. A. S.  "Native-American Slavery and Territoriality in the Colonial Upper Great Lakes Region", Vol. 28, No. 2 (Fall, 2002), Michigan Historical Review.  Mount Pleasant, MI:  Central Michigan University.
Ekberg, Carl J.  "Black Slavery in Illinois 1720–1765", Western Illinois Regional Studies,  12 (1989).  Macomb, IL:  Western Illinois University.
Ekberg, Carl J.  Colonial Ste. Genevieve: An Adventure on the Mississippi Frontier.  Carbondale, IL:  Southern Illinois University Press, 2014. 
Ekberg, Carl J.  French Roots in the Illinois Country: The Mississippi Frontier in Colonial Times.  Urbana, IL:  University of Illinois Press, 2000.
Ekberg, Carl J.  Stealing Indian Women: Native Slavery in the Illinois Country.  Urbana, IL:  University of Illinois Press, 2010.
Ethridge, Robbie Franklyn and Sheri Marie Shuck-Hall.  Mapping the Mississippian Shatter Zone: The Colonial Indian Slave Trade and Regional Instability in the American South.  Lincoln, Neb.:  University of Nebraska Press, 2009.
Gallay, Alan.  Indian Slavery in Colonial America.  Lincoln, NE:  University of Nebraska Press, 2009. 
Harris, Norman Dwight.   The History of Negro Servitude in Illinois, and of the Slavery Agitation in that State, 1719-1864.  Chicago, IL:  A.C. McClurg & Company, 1904.
Harrold, Stanley.  Border War: Fighting over Slavery before the Civil War.  Chapel Hill, NC:  University of North Carolina Press, 2010.
Illinois Historic Preservation Agency.  Cahokia and the Hinterlands: Middle Mississippian Cultures of the Midwest.  Urbana, IL:  University of Illinois Press, 1999.
Kastor, Peter J. and François Weil, Eds.  Empires of the Imagination: Transatlantic Histories of the Louisiana Purchase.  Charlottesville, VA:  University of Virginia Press, 2009.
Krohe Jr., James.  Corn Kings and One-Horse Thieves: A Plain-Spoken History of Mid-Illinois.  Carbondale, IL:  Southern Illinois University Press, 2017.
Lauber, Almon Wheeler. Indian slavery in colonial times within the present limits of the United States Volume LIV, Number 3, Issue 134 of Studies in history, economics, and public law.  New York, NY:  Columbia University Press, 1913. 
Lehman, Christopher P.  Slavery in the Upper Mississippi Valley, 1787–1865: A History of Human Bondage in Illinois, Iowa, Minnesota and Wisconsin. Jefferson, NC:  McFarland, 2011.
MacDonald, David.  Lives of Fort de Chartres: Commandants, Soldiers, and Civilians in French Illinois, 1720–1770.  Carbondale, IL:  Southern Illinois University, 2016.
Magnaghi, Russell M.  Red Slavery in the Great Lakes Country during the French and British Regime.
Martin, Debra L. and Anna J. Osterholtz.  Bodies and Lives in Ancient America: Health Before Columbus.  London, UK:  Routledge, 2015.
McFarland, Joe.  "When Salt was Gold - Illinois DNR", Outdoor Illinois, October 2009. Springfield, IL:  Illinois Department of Natural Resources.
McKirdy, Charles R.  Lincoln Apostate: The Matson Slave Case.  Jackson, MS:  University Press of Mississippi, 2011. 
Milner, George R.  The Moundbuilders: Ancient Peoples of Eastern North America.  London, UK:  Thames and Hudson, Ltd., 2003.
Milner, G.R., Eve Anderson, and Virginia G. Smith.  "Warfare in Late Prehistoric West-Central Illinois", American Antiquity, Vol. 56, No. 4, October 1991.  Cambridge, UK:  Cambridge University Press.
Morgan, M. J.  Land of Big Rivers: French and Indian Illinois, 1699-1778.  Southern Illinois University Press, 2010.
Morrissey, Robert Michael.  Empire by Collaboration: Indians, Colonists, and Governments in Colonial Illinois Country.  Philadelphia, PA:  University of Pennsylvania Press, 2015.
Musgrave, Jon.  Slaves, Salt, Sex and Mr. Crenshaw: The Real Story of the Old Slave House and America's Reverse Underground R. R..  IllinoisHistory.com, 2008.
Musgrave, Jon.  "Black Kidnappings in the Wabash and Ohio Valleys of Illinois".  Research Paper presented at Dr. John Y. Simon's Seminar in Illinois History at Southern Illinois University at Carbondale, April–May 1997, Carbondale, IL.
Musgrave, Jon.  Potts Hill Gang, Sturdivant Gang, and Ford's Ferry Gang Rogue's Gallery, Hardin County in IllinoisGenWeb.  Springfield, IL:  The Illinois Gen Web Project, 2018.
Myers, Jacob W.  "History of the Gallatin County Salines”, October 1921-January 1922, Journal of the Illinois State Historical Society, 14:3-4.
Namias, June.  White Captives: Gender and Ethnicity on the American Frontier.  Chapel Hill, NC:  University of North Carolina Press Books, 2005.
Pauketat, Timothy R.  Cahokia: Ancient America's Great City on the Mississippi.  New York, NY:  Penguin, 2009.
Ress, David.  Governor Edward Coles and the Vote to Forbid Slavery in Illinois, 1823-1824.  Jefferson, NC:  McFarland, 2006. 
Rushforth, Brett.  Bonds of Alliance: Indigenous and Atlantic Slaveries in New France. Chapel Hill, NC:  University of North Carolina Press Books, 2013.
Sleeper-Smith, Susan.  Indian Women and French Men: Rethinking Cultural Encounter in the Western Great Lakes.  Cambridge, MA:  University of Massachusetts Press, 2001.
Stinson, Jennifer Kirsten.  "Bondage and resistance in the land of lead: antebellum Upper Mississippi River Valley mineral country landscapes", Slavery & Abolition, Volume 38, Issue 1.  London, UK: Taylor & Francis, 2017. 
Snyder, Christina  Slavery in Indian Country: The Changing Face of Captivity in Early America.  Cambridge, MA: Harvard University Press, 2010.
Trudel, Marcel.  Dictionnaire des esclaves et de leurs propriétaires au Canada français, Volume 100 of Cahiers du Québec  (Dictionary of Slaves and their Owners in French Canada, Volume 100 of Cahiers du Québec).  Montreal, QC:  Hurtubise HMH, 1990.
Wedel, Mildred Mott.  "The Identity of La Salle's Pana Slave", Plains Anthropologist, Vol. 18, No. 61 August 1973.  Plains Anthropological Society. 
White, Richard.  The Middle Ground: Indians, Empires, and Republics in the Great Lakes Region, 1650–1815.  Cambridge, UK:  Cambridge University Press, 2010. 
White, Sophie.  Wild Frenchmen and Frenchified Indians: Material Culture and Race in Colonial Louisiana. Philadelphia, PA:  University of Pennsylvania Press, 2013.
Wilson, Carol.  Freedom at Risk:  The Kidnapping of Free Blacks in America, 1780-1865. Lexington, KY: University Press of Kentucky, 1994.
Young, Biloine W. and Melvin Leo Fowler.  Cahokia, the Great Native American Metropolis.  Urbana, IL:  University of Illinois Press, 2000. 
The History of Jo Daviess County, Illinois.  Chicago, IL:  H.F. Kett & Company, 1878.

External links

Slavery in Illinois by Cinda Klickna

African-American history of Illinois
Slavery
Illinois